Ashley McGregor (born March 1, 1993) is a female swimmer from Canada, who mostly competes in the breaststroke events. She claimed two invidividual medals and two in the relay for four at the 2011 Pan American Games in Guadalajara, Jalisco, Mexico. McGregor started the games by winning a bronze in the 100 m breaststroke followed by a gold in the 200 m. It was the first and only Canadian gold medal in the swimming events the 2011 Pan American Games. McGregor then went on to win a silver medal as part of the Canadian women's 4 x 100 m medley relay team. She earned her fourth medal with a bronze as part of Canada's 4 x 100 freestyle relay team.

References

External links
Swimming Canada profile

1993 births
Anglophone Quebec people
Canadian female breaststroke swimmers
Living people
People from Pointe-Claire
Sportspeople from Quebec
Swimmers at the 2011 Pan American Games
Pan American Games gold medalists for Canada
Pan American Games silver medalists for Canada
Pan American Games bronze medalists for Canada
Pan American Games medalists in swimming
Medalists at the 2011 Pan American Games
20th-century Canadian women
21st-century Canadian women